Caucau Turagabeci is a former Fijian international lawn bowler.

Bowls career
Turagabeci made his international debut in 1981 and has represented Fiji at three Commonwealth Games. He competed in the pairs event at the 1986 Commonwealth Games, the singles event at the 1998 Commonwealth Games and the singles event at the 2006 Commonwealth Games.

He just missed out on winning a World Championship bronze medal in 2004, after losing the bronze medal play off to Russell Meyer by a score of 15-9.

He won three silver medals at the Asia Pacific Bowls Championships.

His son Eminoni Turagabeci is also a Fijian lawn bowler.

References

Fijian male bowls players
1939 births
Living people
Bowls players at the 1986 Commonwealth Games
Bowls players at the 1998 Commonwealth Games
Bowls players at the 2006 Commonwealth Games